The 1976 Houston Cougars football team, also known as the Houston Cougars, Houston, or UH, represented the University of Houston in the 1976 NCAA Division I football season.  It was the 31st year of season play for Houston.  The team was coached by fifteenth-year head football coach, Bill Yeoman.  The team played its home games at the Astrodome, a 53,000-person capacity stadium off-campus in Houston.  It was Houston's first year of season play as a full member of the Southwest Conference eligible as champions.  Upon winning the conference as co-champions, the Cougars competed against the Maryland Terrapins in the Cotton Bowl Classic, and finished the post-season at an all-time highest national ranking in the history of the program.  Senior defensive tackle Wilson Whitley received the Lombardi Award following the season. Future UH and Baylor head coach Art Briles played on this team.

Previous season
The 1975 season was the fifth and final year of provisional play for Houston as a member of the Southwest Conference in football.  The Cougars earned an abysmal 2–8 record with wins over only Lamar and Tulsa.  It was head coach Bill Yeoman's fourteenth year, and the worst Cougars record in terms of wins since the 1964 season.  At the conclusion of the season, Cougars guard Everett Little was drafted to the Tampa Bay Buccaneers in the fourth round, and 124th overall in the 1976 NFL Draft.  Defensive back Donnie McGraw was drafted to the Denver Broncos in the thirteenth round, and 362nd overall.

Schedule

Poll rankings

Coaching staff

References

Houston
Houston Cougars football seasons
Cotton Bowl Classic champion seasons
Southwest Conference football champion seasons
Houston Cougars football